A ploy is a tactic (method), strategy, or gimmick.

Ploy may also refer to:

Ploy (board game), a board game
ploy (film), a 2007 Thai film
Ploy (musical instrument), a Cambodian musical instrument